Tecovasaurus (te-KOH-va-SAWR-us) is an extinct Late Triassic amniote genus of unknown affinities, known only from teeth. It was initially described as a basal ornithischian dinosaur, subsequently reclassified as a member of the clade Archosauriformes of uncertain phylogenetic placement (Irmis et al. (2007), and later, taking into account the similarity of its teeth to the teeth of traversodontid cynodonts such as Dadadon (shared presence of teeth with sub-triangular crowns, enlarged denticles, and thecodont tooth implantation), as an amniote of uncertain affinities (Kammerer et al., 2012; though "based on dissimilarities in gross morphology and geographic separation" the authors considered it more likely that the taxon is indeed an archosauriform rather than a traversodontid). It is named after the Tecovas Formation, in Texas and Arizona, which yielded the holotype remains.

References 

 Irmis, R.B., Parker, W.G., Nesbitt, S.J., and Liu, J. (2007).  Early ornithischian dinosaurs: the Triassic record. Historical Biology 19(1):3-22. .

External links 
 Dinosauria Translation and Pronunciation Guide

Late Triassic reptiles of North America
Amniotes